Graphics is a live solo album by multi-instrumentalist and composer Joe McPhee, recorded in 1977 and first released on the Swiss HatHut label.

Reception

Allmusic reviewer Brian Olewnick states "Graphics is a rare gem but a necessary one for the McPhee fan, and is well worth the trouble of seeking out both for its inherent beauty and as a key work in the career of one of the strongest players in the jazz avant-garde of the late 20th century".

Track listing 
All compositions by Joe McPhee
 "Graphics ¾" - 12:23
 "Legendary Heroes" - 15:02
 "Vieux Carre/Straight" - 7:04
 "Daisy Bones" - 2:47
 "Tenor No. 2" - 6:50 		
 "Anamorphosis"- 14:10
 "Trumpet" - 11:35
 "Graphics 2/4" - 8:50

Personnel 
Joe McPhee - tenor saxophone, soprano saxophone, trumpet, cornet, bells, conch shell

References 

Joe McPhee live albums
1978 live albums
Hathut Records live albums